Thakkarbapa Nagar is one of the 182 Legislative Assembly constituencies of Gujarat state in India. It is part of Ahmedabad district and it came into existence after 2008 delimitation.

List of segments

This assembly seat represents the following segments,

 Ahmedabad City Taluka (Part) – Ahmedabad Municipal Corporation (Part) Ward No. – 22, 25, 26.

Member of Legislative Assembly
2022 - Kanchanben Vinubhai Radadiya, Bharatiya Janata Party

Election results

2022

2017

2012

See also
 List of constituencies of the Gujarat Legislative Assembly
 Ahmedabad district

References

External links
 

Assembly constituencies of Gujarat
Ahmedabad district